Tom Swire is a former British actor best known for playing Seb Webb in Footballers Wives and its ITV2 spin-off Footballers' Wives: Extra Time. He has also appeared in the BBC series Blackpool. Swire has since retired from acting and is now the director of a cleaning company based in Blackpool.

References

External links

Year of birth missing (living people)
Living people
British male television actors